Pablo Antonio Gabas (born 21 April 1982) is an Argentine-Costa Rican football player who last played for Alajuelense in Primera División.

He made his debut in Costa Rican Primera División back on 2002 playing with AD Santa Barbara on a loan from Necaxa and due his high performances with them he was signed by one of the 2 most important teams in Costa Rica, LD Alajuelense. With Alajuelense in the 2014–15 CONCACAF Champions League, he scored twice in the second leg of the semi-final against the Montreal Impact of Canada.

He is currently applying for Costa Rican citizenship after living nine years in Costa Rica, his wife coming from Costa Rica. He made his debut with the Costa Rica national football team on February 29, 2012 against Wales.

External links
 Profile at theplayersagent.com 
 BDFA profile
  at Medio Tiempo

References

1982 births
Living people
Argentine footballers
Argentine expatriate footballers
Association football midfielders
Liga MX players
Club Necaxa footballers
L.D. Alajuelense footballers
Querétaro F.C. footballers
Chiapas F.C. footballers
Expatriate footballers in Costa Rica
Expatriate footballers in Mexico
Footballers from Rosario, Santa Fe
Argentine emigrants to Costa Rica
Costa Rica international footballers